Annenskij may refer to:
3724 Annenskij, an asteroid
Innokentij Fëdorovič Annenskij, a Russian poet, critic and translator